Various publications and commentators have offered a range of predictions of the end of Google, a search engine established in 1998.

History
In 2007, a writer for Wired shared a rumor that Wikipedia's co-founder Jimmy Wales had a secret project to end Google. A 2008 article on potential ends of Google noted at that time that Google had 61 percent of traffic while its major competitors Yahoo and Microsoft could catch up. At the 2008 launch of Cuil, various writers described how this search engine would end Google. In 2008, media commentator Jeff Jarvis said that he saw no competitor for Google except a trend of openness. In 2009, a writer for The Daily Beast speculated that Wolfram Alpha would out compete Google as a search engine.

Writers for Forbes have speculated on various situations which could end Google. In 2011, a writer described how Siri would end Google. In 2012, a writer described that nationalization of digital products could end Google. Another writer in 2012 argued that Google opposed the Stop Online Piracy Act by participating in protests against SOPA and PIPA because the company felt an existential threat to its business model in that law's view of digital property rights.

See also
Predictions of the end of Wikipedia

References 

Criticism of Google
Mass media disestablishments
Prediction